Stipa tulcanensis is a species of grass in the family Poaceae.
It is found only in Ecuador.

References

tulcanensis
Bunchgrasses of South America
Endemic flora of Ecuador
Critically endangered flora of South America
Taxonomy articles created by Polbot